The Vila Family (Spanish:La familia Vila) is a 1950 Spanish comedy film directed by Ignacio F. Iquino and starring José Isbert, Juan de Landa and Modesto Cid.

Cast
 Barta Barri 
 Modesto Cid as Abuelo  
 Jesús Colomer as Jaime  
 Juan de Landa as Teófilo Torrens  
 Silvia de Soto as Patrona  
 María Victoria Durá as Engracia  
 María Francés as Adela  
 Maruchi Fresno as Carmen  
 José Isbert as Señor Vila  
 Lina Izquierdo as Nuri  
 Liria Izquierdo as Izquierdo, Lina  
 Fernando Nogueras as Jorge Alsua  
 Juana Soler as Elvira 
 Eugenio Testa as Don Cosme

References

Bibliography
 Labanyi, Jo & Pavlović, Tatjana. A Companion to Spanish Cinema. John Wiley & Sons, 2012.

External links 

1950 films
1950 drama films
Spanish drama films
1950s Spanish-language films
Films directed by Ignacio F. Iquino
Films with screenplays by Ignacio F. Iquino
Spanish black-and-white films
1950s Spanish films